The Higher Education Statistics Agency (HESA) was the official agency for the collection, analysis and dissemination of quantitative information about higher education in the United Kingdom. HESA became a directorate of Jisc after a merger in 2022.

HESA was set up by agreement between the relevant government departments, the higher education funding councils and the universities and colleges in 1993, following the White Paper "Higher Education: a new framework", which called for more coherence in HE statistics, and the 1992 Higher and Further Education Acts, which established an integrated higher education system throughout the United Kingdom. In 2018 HESA became the Designated Data Body for higher education in England under the Higher Education and Research Act 2017, with designation passing to Jisc after the 2022 merger.

Data Collections
HESA collected data from all publicly funded higher education institutions (HEIs) in the UK as well as a small number of private providers. The annual data collection streams were:
 Student data collection information about students, courses and qualifications at HEIs
 AP Student data collection information about students, courses and qualifications at Alternative Providers of higher education
 Staff data collection information about staff employed by HEIs
 Finance record income and expenditure of HEIs
 Graduate Outcomes survey of graduate activities 15 months after leaving higher education 
 Aggregate offshore record count of students studying wholly overseas for UK HE qualifications
 HE Business and Community Interaction survey information about interactions between HEIs and business and the wider community
 Estates management record buildings, estates and environmental information about HEIs
 Initial Teacher Training (ITT) record
 Unistats collection
 Provider Profile collection
 Destinations of Leavers from Higher Education survey of graduate activities six months after leaving HE (2002/03 to 2016/17)

Statistical Outputs
HESA published statistics and analyses based on the data it collects:
 Statistical Bulletins Official Statistics outputs summarising each data stream
 Annual open data releases detailed statistical tables 
 Performance Indicators comparative data on the performance of HEIs in Widening participation, student retention, learning and teaching outcomes, research output and employment of graduates

Jisc processes HESA data to provide data extracts for research and publication by external users such as League tables of British universities.

See also
 Department for Employment and Learning
 GuildHE
 Office for Students
 Higher Education Funding Council for Wales
 Jisc
 Quality Assurance Agency for Higher Education
 Scottish Funding Council
 Skills Funding Agency
 UCAS
 Universities UK
 Universities in the United Kingdom
 Universities' Statistical Record

External links 
 

Department for Business, Innovation and Skills
Higher education organisations based in the United Kingdom
Organizations established in 1993
Organisations based in Cheltenham
Private companies limited by guarantee of the United Kingdom
Statistical organisations in the United Kingdom
1993 establishments in the United Kingdom
Statistics of education